Orectognathus is a genus of ants in the subfamily Myrmicinae.

Species

Orectognathus alligator Taylor, 1980
Orectognathus antennatus Smith, 1854
Orectognathus biroi Szabó, 1926
Orectognathus chyzeri Emery, 1897
Orectognathus clarki Brown, 1953
Orectognathus coccinatus Taylor, 1980
Orectognathus csikii Szabó, 1926
Orectognathus darlingtoni Taylor, 1977
Orectognathus echinus Taylor & Lowery, 1972
Orectognathus elegantulus Taylor, 1977
Orectognathus horvathi Szabó, 1926
Orectognathus howensis Wheeler, 1927
Orectognathus hystrix Taylor & Lowery, 1972
Orectognathus kanangra Taylor, 1980
Orectognathus longispinosus Donisthorpe, 1941
Orectognathus mjobergi Forel, 1915
Orectognathus nanus Taylor, 1977
Orectognathus nigriventris Mercovich, 1958
Orectognathus parvispinus Taylor, 1977
Orectognathus phyllobates Brown, 1958
Orectognathus robustus Taylor, 1977
Orectognathus roomi Taylor, 1977
Orectognathus rostratus Lowery, 1967
Orectognathus sarasini Emery, 1914
Orectognathus satan Brown, 1953
Orectognathus sexspinosus Forel, 1915
Orectognathus szentivanyi (Brown, 1958)
Orectognathus velutinus Taylor, 1977
Orectognathus versicolor Donisthorpe, 1940

References

External links

Myrmicinae
Ant genera